The zongora is an instrument typical of Maramureș, a region of Romania. It is similar to a guitar, but has fewer strings. In the past it had two strings, but nowadays it has four or even five. When played, the instrument is usually held vertically. The string layout is compressed to the central inch of the fingerboard to allow rapid rhythmical strumming. Recent musicians make more harmonic changes than in the past, but still use only major chords.

The word zongora is also Hungarian for piano.

References

Further reading

External links 
 Plucked strings, Traditional music in Romania, The Eliznik Romania pages. Accessed January 2022.

Romanian musical instruments
Moldovan musical instruments
Romanian words and phrases
Hungarian words and phrases